Kočov is a municipality and village in Tachov District in the Plzeň Region of the Czech Republic. It has about 200 inhabitants.

Administrative parts
Villages and hamlets of Janov, Klíčov and Ústí are administrative parts of Kočov.

References

Villages in Tachov District